Ronald Theodore Barkhouse (April 22, 1926 – April 7, 2014) was a merchant and politician in Nova Scotia, Canada. He represented Lunenburg East in the Nova Scotia House of Assembly from 1974 to 1984 as a Progressive Conservative member.

Early life and education
He was born in New Ross, Nova Scotia, the son of Alfred S. Barkhouse and Anne Bertha Meister, and was educated at the Horton Academy.

Career
Barkhouse operated a wholesale lumber business and a general store. In 1951, he married Eleanor Plunket Grant. Barkhouse was a member of the municipal council for Chester from 1952 to 1967 and also served on the local school board. He served in the province's Executive Council as Minister of Mines and Energy. Barkhouse was also a commissioner for the Supreme Court of Nova Scotia.

History 
Barkhouse co-authored a genealogy book entitled 100 Day Voyage to Freedom containing Barkhouse family lineage from the original Berghaus immigrant couple to Nova Scotia. The book's facts are contained in a genealogy website named for Barkhouse.

He authored a stream of consciousness style manuscript entitled The Olden Days and the Olden Ways in 2003, about the way life used to be in the New Ross area.

According to his obituary, he "was the Chairman of the New Ross Centennial Committee, formed to officially commemorate Canada's 100th anniversary. The committee went on to promote a project for 150th anniversary of the founding of New Ross, culminating in the opening of Ross Farm Museum in 1970."

Death
Barkhouse died in Halifax on April 7, 2014, at the age of 87.

References
 Canadian Parliamentary Guide, 1984, PG Normandin
 Entry from Canadian Who's Who

1926 births
2014 deaths
Progressive Conservative Association of Nova Scotia MLAs
Members of the Executive Council of Nova Scotia
Nova Scotia municipal councillors